Follow Me Home is a 1996 film directed by activist and filmmaker Peter Bratt. It explores spiritual and intercultural race relations through the lives of four artists, one African American, one Native American, and two Latin-American cousins, who embark on a cross-country road trip to paint a mural on the White House. Along the way, they meet a mysterious African American woman bearing a deep secret.

The film was re-released in October 2020.

Distribution
Follow Me Home has yet to be picked up by a major distribution company. The film is currently being shown on request, usually at universities and community centers, followed by a discussion facilitated by Native American activist Lakota Harden.

Awards
Peter Bratt received the Audience Award for Best Feature at the 1996 San Francisco International Film Festival, and the film earned the Best Feature Film Audience Award. It was also an Official Selection in the 1996 Sundance Film Festival.

References

External links
 
 

1996 films
American independent films
Films about race and ethnicity
Films set in San Francisco
Films set in the San Francisco Bay Area
1996 independent films
1990s English-language films
1990s American films